Kikambala, also known as Vipingo, is a settlement at Kenya's former Coast Province. It is currently in Kilifi County.

See also
Provinces of Kenya

References 

Populated places in Coast Province